The Ballajora Mine also referred to as the Maughold Head Mine, was an iron ore, hematite and copper mine located in the parish of Maughold, Isle of Man. The mine lay principally on the farmland of Magher-beck.
The head engineer of the mine, referred to as the Mine Captain, was John Faragher.

History
Mining was an important occupation throughout the Isle of Man in the nineteenth century and the parish of Maughold was no exception.
The mine at Drynane is mentioned in papers as far back as 1700 and at various periods shafts had been sunk at the Stack Moar on Maughold Head, at the Church Glebe and finally at Ballajora, situated at the cliff at Gob-ny-Garvain, Port-e-Vullen in the Cornah Glen.
The mine was worked extensively from its opening in 1858 until its closure in 1874, yielding a considerable output of hematite.

See also

 Foxdale Mines
 Great Laxey Mine
 Great Laxey Mine Railway
 Great Snaefell Mine
 Laxey Wheel
 Snaefell Wheel

References

Sources
Bibliography

Bawden T.A., Garrad L.S., Qualtrough J.W., and Scatchard W.R. The Industrial Archaeology of the Isle of Man. Published by David & Charles, 1972. (out of print)
Industrial Archaeology of the Isle of Man - an Introduction. Produced by Manx National Heritage, 1993. Published by the Manx Experience.
Manx Mines, Rocks, and Minerals. Published by the Manx Heritage Foundation in co-operation with Manx National Heritage. 1994

Underground mines in the Isle of Man
1858 establishments in the Isle of Man